A list of films produced in France in 1951.

See also
 1951 in France

References

External links
 French films of 1951 at the Internet Movie Database
French films of 1951 at Cinema-francais.fr

1951
Films
French